The tornado outbreak of March 28–29, 2010 affected the Southeast United States and The Bahamas on March 28, 2010.

A low pressure system pushed northward through the Ohio Valley on March 28. Several tornadoes were reported in the warm sector stretching from Virginia south to Florida. The Piedmont Triad was hardest hit.  A tornado emergency was declared for parts of Forsyth, Randolph, Davidson, and Guilford counties.   Damage was also reported near Charlotte.  An EF3 tornado struck High Point, NC.   An EF2 tornado hit Linwood in Davidson County, NC, and two more EF2 tornadoes struck south-central South Carolina.

Confirmed tornadoes

March 28 event

March 29 event

High Point, North Carolina

An EF3 tornado struck High Point, North Carolina, causing 3 injuries and destroying or damaging many structures.  The tornado touched down as a 100-mph EF1 in southwest Guilford County, severely damaging a daycare center and flipping an unoccupied school bus.  The tornado moved north across Highway 311 and gained intensity, becoming an EF2 that caused significant damage to structures in the area, including blowing a bedroom off of a single-story home.

It briefly reached EF3 in intensity when it entered a residential area, removing the second story off of a 2-story home and damaging or destroying 50-60 homes in the neighborhood.  The tornado weakened to an EF2 and moved into a highly urbanized area, causing minor to moderate damage, and again removing the 2nd story off of a 2-story home.

The storm finally weakened to an EF1 and finally lifted just north of Oak Hollow Lake.

This was the first EF3 tornado to strike the Piedmont Triad region since May 8, 2008, when an EF3 tornado struck Clemmons, just outside Winston-Salem. The tornado caused $9.95 million in property damage, destroying 40 homes and businesses and damaging another 609 structures. The mayor of High Point declared a state of emergency.

Freeport, Bahamas

A tornado of possible EF2 strength hit the Freeport port, toppling a crane and killing 3 workers and injuring 4 more. Roofs were torn off of multiple buildings as well.  Concerns have been raised within the Bahamian government that there was no tornado warning issued by the Bahamas Department of Meteorology.

See also
List of North American tornadoes and tornado outbreaks
Tornadoes of 2010

Notes

References

External links
Collection of information on the Piedmont tornadoes by WGHP

03-28
Tornadoes in Florida
Tornadoes in North Carolina
Tornadoes in South Carolina
Tornadoes in Virginia
High Point, North Carolina
Carolinas Tornado Outbreak
Carolinas Tornado Outbreak